Anatoli Stepanovich Fedorov (15 January 1936 – 20 September 2012) was a Soviet and Russian rower and rowing coach.

Fedorov competed at the 1961 European Rowing Championships with the coxed four and won silver. He won a bronze medal at the 1962 World Rowing Championships in Lucerne with the coxed four. He won a bronze medal at the 1971 European Rowing Championships with the coxed four.

He died in 2012 in Petrozavodsk, Russia.

References

1936 births
2012 deaths
Russian male rowers
Soviet male rowers
World Rowing Championships medalists for the Soviet Union
European Rowing Championships medalists